The Pan-Africa Mosquito Control Association (PAMCA) is an international organization of research scientists dedicated to vector control and elimination of diseases like malaria.
The organization also aims to spread information on the study of mosquitoes and connect Africans from across the continent. PAMCA was first established in Kenya, and has chapter offices located in Tanzania and Nigeria.

PAMCA works with organizations including KEMRI and the National Institute for Medical Research (NIMR) in Tanzania to form networks and collaborate on research projects.
They also organize conferences where entomologists discuss topics in mosquito-borne diseases such as dengue, malaria, and yellow fever.

See also 
 American Mosquito Control Association
 German Mosquito Control Association

References 

Health in Africa
Research institutes in Kenya
Medical and health organisations based in Kenya